Wayne Township is a township in Greene County, Pennsylvania, United States. The population was 1,022 at the 2020 census.

History
The King Covered Bridge and Ernest Thralls House are listed on the National Register of Historic Places. The township was the site of the highly publicized murder of West Virginia teenager Skylar Neese on July 6, 2012.

Geography
Wayne Township is in south-central Greene County and is bordered to the south by Monongalia County, West Virginia.

Unincorporated communities in the township include Rush Crossroads, Kuhntown, Spraggs, Brock, and Brave, the primary settlement. The town of Blacksville, West Virginia, borders part of the southern edge of the township.

Demographics

As of the census of 2000, there were 1,223 people, 465 households, and 344 families residing in the township.  The population density was 31.0 people per square mile (12.0/km).  There were 536 housing units at an average density of 13.6/sq mi (5.2/km).  The racial makeup of the township was 99.02% White, 0.33% African American, 0.33% Native American, 0.08% Asian, and 0.25% from two or more races. Hispanic or Latino of any race were 0.90% of the population.

There were 465 households, out of which 31.8% had children under the age of 18 living with them, 61.5% were married couples living together, 8.4% had a female householder with no husband present, and 26.0% were non-families. 21.1% of all households were made up of individuals, and 9.2% had someone living alone who was 65 years of age or older.  The average household size was 2.63 and the average family size was 3.04.

In the township the population was spread out, with 25.8% under the age of 18, 6.5% from 18 to 24, 27.6% from 25 to 44, 28.0% from 45 to 64, and 12.0% who were 65 years of age or older.  The median age was 38 years. For every 100 females, there were 102.8 males.  For every 100 females age 18 and over, there were 98.9 males.

The median income for a household in the township was $29,950, and the median income for a family was $35,625. Males had a median income of $32,727 versus $21,528 for females. The per capita income for the township was $14,296.  About 13.3% of families and 13.8% of the population were below the poverty line, including 14.1% of those under age 18 and 7.5% of those age 65 or over.

Education
The school district is Central Greene School District.

References

Townships in Greene County, Pennsylvania
Townships in Pennsylvania